The Federal Correctional Institution (FCI Talladega) is a medium-security United States federal prison for male inmates in Alabama. It is operated by the Federal Bureau of Prisons, a division of the United States Department of Justice. The facility also includes an adjacent minimum-security satellite camp that also houses male offenders.

FCI Talladega is located approximately 50 miles from Birmingham, Alabama and 100 miles from Atlanta, Georgia.

1991 inmate rebellion
On August 21, 1991, 121 Cuban inmates who had been incarcerated since the 1980 Mariel boatlift rioted and took over the facility in an effort to block their deportation to Cuba. Most of the prison staff who were on duty at the time escaped, but nine staff members, seven men and two women, were forced to barricade themselves in a room with mattresses. A ten-day standoff ensued, during which federal negotiators conducted two face-to-face meetings with the inmates, who released a sick hostage in exchange for a chance to speak with a reporter. However, the inmates repeatedly threatened to kill the other hostages if their scheduled deportation to Cuba was not cancelled. Sanitary conditions were rapidly deteriorating inside the prison and some hostages, using hand signals during a food delivery and medical visit, conveyed their fear to prison officials earlier that the inmates were discussing specific plans "to throw a hostage from the roof and to stab one or more hostages." Based on that information, US Deputy Attorney General William P. Barr, FBI Director William S. Sessions, and Bureau of Prisons director J. Michael Quinlan authorized the FBI Hostage Rescue Team to storm the facility.

At 3:43 AM on August 31, 1991, several loud explosions were heard inside Cell Block Alpha, the section of the prison where the hostages were being held. A team of about 200 specially trained agents had converged on the cell building at a number of points using explosives to break open doors. Once inside, they detonated a number of stun grenades, devices that issue a huge flash and shockwave intended to temporarily incapacitate anyone caught in the blast. By 3:46 AM, the agents had freed the hostages and taken all 121 inmates into custody.

Notable inmates (current and former)

References 

Buildings and structures in Talladega County, Alabama
Talladega
Prisons in Alabama
Prison uprisings in the United States